Mountain Creek is a creek in North Texas. The creek rises near Alvarado in eastern Johnson County. It flows northeast for thirty-eight miles, forming a boundary between Grand Prairie and Dallas, where it meets Mountain Creek Lake, the mouth of the creek is on the West Fork of the Trinity River. Walnut Creek is a tributary of the creek.

References 

Rivers of Texas
Dallas County, Texas
Johnson County, Texas
Tarrant County, Texas